Bloxom may refer to:

Bloxom (surname)
Bloxom, Virginia